Title 43 of the United States Code outlines the role of Public Lands in the United States Code.

 —Bureau of Land Management
 —United States Geological Survey
 —Surveys
 —District Land Offices
 —Land Districts
 —Withdrawal From Settlement, Location, Sale, or Entry
 —Homesteads
 —Timber and Stone Lands
 —Grazing Lands
 —Desert-Land Entries
 —Underground-Water Reclamation Grants
 —Discovery, Development, And Marking Of Water Holes, Etc., By Government
 —Board on Geographic Names
 —Reclamation and Irrigation of Lands by Federal Government
 —Boulder Canyon Project
 —Colorado River Storage Project
 —Federal Lands Included in State Irrigation Districts
 —Grants of Desert Lands to States for Reclamation
 —Appropriation of Waters; Reservoir Sites
 —Sale and Disposal of Public Lands
 —Reservation and Sale of Town Sites on Public Lands
 —Survey of Public Lands
 —Bounty Lands
 —Reservations and Grants to States for Public Purposes
 —Grants in Aid of Railroads and Wagon Roads
 —Forfeiture Of Northern Pacific Railroad Indemnity Land Grants
 —Rights-Of-Way And Other Easements In Public Lands
 —Grants of Swamp and Overflowed Lands
 —Drainage Under State Laws
 —Unlawful Inclosures Or Occupancy; Obstructing Settlement Or Transit
 —Lands Held Under Color of Title
 —Abandoned Military Reservations
 —Public Lands in Oklahoma
 —Miscellaneous Provisions Relating To Public Lands
 —Submerged Lands
 —Administration of Public Lands
 —Department of the Interior
 —Colorado River Basin Project
 —Colorado River Basin Salinity Control
 —Colorado River Floodway
 —Alaska Native Claims Settlement
 —Implementation of Alaska Native Claims Settlement and Alaska Statehood
 —Trans-Alaska Pipeline
 —Federal Land Policy and Management
 —Outer Continental Shelf Resource Management
 —Public Rangelands Improvement
 —Crude Oil Transportation Systems
 —Abandoned Shipwrecks
 —Reclamation States Emergency Drought Relief
 —Federal Land Transaction Facilitation

External links

U.S. Code Title 43, via United States Government Printing Office
U.S. Code Title 43, via Cornell University

43
Title 43